The Gran Canaria blue chaffinch (Fringilla polatzeki) is a species of passerine bird in the finch family Fringillidae. It is endemic to Gran Canaria in Spain's Canary Islands.

Taxonomy
Until 2015, the species Fringilla teydea was classified with two subspecies: Fringilla teydea polatzeki from Gran Canaria and Fringilla teydea teydea from Tenerife. However, a study published in March 2016 showed that a classification as different species, Frigilla polatzeki and Fringilla teydea, is justified.

Description

Gran Canaria blue chaffinches resemble common chaffinches, and are smaller in size than Tenerife blue chaffinches. Other differences are that they have two white bands in the wings, a whiter belly, or less blue shades.

Females are a dull grey-brown.

Distribution
This bird is found only in the highlands of Gran Canaria, mainly in the Inagua Natural Reserve. The species' primary habitat is mountain Canary Island pine (Pinus canariensis) forest in 1.000 m. It is most common in coniferous forest areas with dense, old trees.

Behavior
It primarily eats Canary Island pine seeds. Like the common chaffinch, but, unlike most other finches, its young are fed extensively on insects. Breeding from the end of April to late July or early August, it builds a nest from pine needles and broom branches and lays two eggs. This bird is not migratory.  This bird breeding success is low with the cause of predation, mostly by the Great Spotted Woodpecker.

In danger of extinction
The Gran Canaria blue chaffinch is one of the most endangered species of birds on the planet. Unlike the Tenerife blue chaffinch, which has a much wider distribution and compared to that island's population of its species, the Gran Canaria blue chaffinch has an extremely smaller population and is restricted to the area of the pine forests of Ojeda, Inagua and Pajonales.

References

External links

Article: "The Blue Chaffinch of Gran Canaria Fringilla teydea polatzeki: what next?"
The bird in Facebook
Documentary "El pinzón azul de Gran Canaria: biología y conservación del ave más amenazada de Canarias" (1995)
Play list

Gran Canaria blue chaffinch
Birds of the Canary Islands
Gran Canaria blue chaffinch
Fauna of Gran Canaria